The Aquinas Honor Society is the official exclusive honor society of the University of St. Thomas in Houston, Texas.

Membership Requirements
Membership in the Aquinas Honor Society is open to graduating seniors who have a 3.00 cumulative GPA and who have achieved at a 3.30 GPA or better in at least five different semesters on campus.  These requirements ensure that not only has a student successfully maintained a B-average or better, but has maintained at least an A average for more than half of their college career.

A list of eligible candidates is compiled following the deadline for applying for graduation, generally in March.  Later that month, candidates are informed of their selection and are invited to join the society in a ceremony held the following month.

Induction
The Induction Ceremony for the Aquinas Honor Society is held at the end of April each year as part of the UST Honors Convocation.  The Convocation is the highest of Honors invitations at the University, and inducts members into the Delta Epsilon Sigma and Alpha Sigma Lambda national honor societies as well as the Aquinas Honor Society.

Generally consisting of the largest number of inductees for the ceremony, the presentations are made via the Assistant Dean of Arts and Sciences calling the name of the candidate.  The candidate will then rise and make their way to the front of the room to be awarded with their key (similar to that of the Phi Beta Kappa key) from the Dean of their respective school.  A reception generally follows the Convocation.

After receiving the key, the recipient is a member of the honor society and is entitled to wear the key with his or her academic regalia.  No specified means for displaying the key are given, therefore keys are often displayed by various means (chains, pins, or attachments) on the academic robes of graduating students.

University of St. Thomas (Texas)